Leonard Whibley (20 April 1864 – 8 November 1941) was a British scholar who edited A Companion to Greek Studies from 1905 to 1931.

Life
Leonard was born 20 April 1864 at Gravesend, Kent, England. His parents were Ambrose Whibley, silk mercer, and his second wife, Mary Jean Davy. Leonard was educated at Bristol Grammar School and Pembroke College, Cambridge, and elected to a fellowship at Pembroke in 1889.  His elder brother was Charles Whibley who was also educated at Bristol Grammar School and then Jesus College, Cambridge where Charles took a first in classics in 1883.

Leonard was a half-brother of Fred Whibley, copra trader, on Niutao, Ellice Islands (now Tuvalu); and his half-sister was Eliza Eleanor (Lillie), wife of John T. Arundel, owner of J. T. Arundel and Company which evolved into the Pacific Islands Company, and later the Pacific Phosphate Company, which commenced phosphate mining in Nauru and Banaba Island (Ocean Island).

For a short time Leonard Whibley worked in publishing at Methuen and shared a house with his brother Charles Whibley, William Ernest Henley and George Warrington Steevens. Leonard returned to academia with a lectureship in Classics (Ancient History) at Cambridge from 1899 to 1910.  Leonard surprised his family and friends, when in 1920 at age 57, he married Henriette Leiningen,  daughter of Major-General William Brown Barwell and Lise, Countess of Leiningen Westerburg, a descendant of  the "Alt-Leiningen-Westerburg" branch of the House of Leiningen. Leonard died 8 November 1941 at Frensham, Surrey.

Publications
 Political parties in Athens during the Peloponnesian war. Prince Consort Dissertation, Cambridge University Press, 1888.
 Greek Oligarchies. Their Character and Organisation. London: Metheun & Chicago: G.P. Putnam's Sons, 1896. A full-length work on oligarchic government in Classical Greece.
 (ed.) A Companion to Greek Studies, Cambridge University Press, 1905–1931.
 (ed. with Paget Toynbee) Correspondence of Thomas Gray (1716–1771), 3 vols., Oxford: Clarendon Press, 1935. Repr. 1971 with corrections by H. W. Starr (ed.).

References

External links 

 
 

1864 births
1941 deaths
People educated at Bristol Grammar School
English classical scholars
Alumni of Pembroke College, Cambridge
Fellows of Pembroke College, Cambridge
Victorian era
People of the Victorian era